Amy Allen (born October 24, 1976) is an American actress and film crew member who  portrayed the Jedi Master Aayla Secura in Star Wars films released in 2002 and 2005. She worked behind the scenes on many different movies, including A.I. Artificial Intelligence, before she acted in Star Wars.

Acting career
A production assistant with Industrial Light & Magic at the time Star Wars: Episode II – Attack of the Clones was being filmed, Allen was selected to portray Jedi Knight Aayla Secura, a humanoid of the Twi'lek species with distinctive head tails and blue skin. The character was a last-minute addition to the Episode II script; she had been created for a licensed Star Wars comic book by Dark Horse Comics and was added to the film after Lucas saw a cover illustration of the character. Allen had previously been cast as an extra in the DVD release of Star Wars: Episode I – The Phantom Menace as a Twi'lek as well.

She reprised her role as Aayla Secura in Star Wars: Episode III – Revenge of the Sith. Her character is killed by clone troopers as part of the Jedi Purge.

Personal life
Allen graduated from San Francisco State University.  Prior to being cast in the Star Wars films, she was employed behind the camera on the set of several other films. She first worked for Lucasfilm during a break from filming Gangs of New York.

Allen frequently makes appearances at conventions, including C2 and C3, SDCC 2005, Celebration V (2010) and Celebration VI (2012). At Celebration II, she participated in a panel discussion of "Women Who Kick."

Partial filmography
Star Wars: Episode II – Attack of the Clones (2002) - Aayla Secura / Mya Nalle / Yma Nalle / Lela Mayn (uncredited)
Star Wars: Episode III – Revenge of the Sith (2005) - Aayla Secura

References

External links

 
 

1976 births
Living people
Actresses from Burbank, California
San Francisco State University alumni
American film actresses
21st-century American women